Vanessa Nakeita Watts (born 12 August 1987) is a Jamaican cricketer who plays as a right-arm off break bowler. In 2014, she appeared in one One Day International and four Twenty20 Internationals for the West Indies. She plays domestic cricket for Jamaica.

References

External links

1987 births
Living people
Jamaican women cricketers
West Indian women cricketers
West Indies women One Day International cricketers
West Indies women Twenty20 International cricketers